Benjamin Rotch (1794–1854), was a British barrister, politician and author.

Rotch was MP for Knaresborough from 1832 to 1835.

He is buried at Kensal Green Cemetery, London.

References

1794 births
1854 deaths
Burials at Kensal Green Cemetery